Vladimír Zoubek (21 September 1903 in Heřmanův Městec – 24 May 1995 in Prague) was a Czech geologist. He won the Lomonosov Prize for his contributions to geology.

The mineral Zoubekite is named after him.

Notes

1903 births
1995 deaths
Czechoslovak geologists
Foreign Members of the USSR Academy of Sciences
Foreign Members of the Russian Academy of Sciences
Czech geologists
Charles University alumni
People from Heřmanův Městec